Souad Titou (born 14 February 1986) is an Algerian team handball player. She plays for the club Lomme Lille, and helped the Algeria women's national handball team place 22nd at the 2013 world championship games in Serbia.

References

1986 births
Living people
Algerian female handball players
21st-century Algerian people